The Maha Vikas Aghadi or Maharashtra Vikas Aghadi (English: Maharashtra Development Front), abbreviated as MVA, is a state-level political coalition formed after the 2019 Maharashtra Legislative Assembly election under the leadership of Uddhav Thackeray of Shiv Sena (Uddhav faction), Sharad Pawar of the NCP and Sonia Gandhi of the INC, along with the support from the Samajwadi Party, PWPI, CPI(M) and several other political parties including Independent MLAs. MVA is currently the largest alliance in Maharashtra Legislative Council, and also the official opposition in Maharashtra Legislative Assembly.

Uddhav Thackeray was elected as the president of the MVA after a meeting on 26 November 2019. He took oath of the office and secrecy on 28 November 2019 as the 19th Chief Minister of Maharashtra state.

Formation
The alliance was formed by non-NDA political parties in Maharashtra as a result of 2019 Maharashtra political crisis where the Shiv Sena left the NDA post-polls over differences with the BJP in their preferred candidates for Chief Minister and other important portfolio positions after the 2019 Maharashtra Legislative Assembly election. Sharad Pawar, Sanjay Raut, Ahmed Patel and other leaders across the NCP, INC and Shiv Sena worked to realise a new alliance after Shiv Sena and BJP parted ways and Shiv Sena's lone Union Minister in Modi's cabinet, Arvind Sawant, tendered his resignation.

In 2022, during a party meeting, Uddhav Thackeray explained his move to pull out of NDA. He said, "We supported the BJP wholeheartedly to enable them to fulfill their national ambitions. The understanding was they will go national while we will lead in Maharashtra. But we were betrayed and attempts were made to destroy us in our home. So we had to hit back". Thackeray accused BJP of dumping its allies according to its political convenience. He said, "BJP doesn't mean Hindutva. I stand by my comment that Shiv Sena had wasted 25 years in alliance with BJP"

Working
Given the varied ideologies among the partner parties, there was a plan to form two committees for guidance of the coalition - a co-ordination committee for implementation of common minimum programme and other higher decision making committee that will include party chiefs.

2022 Maharashtra political crisis

Eknath Shinde, a senior Shiv Sena leader, wanted to break the Maha Vikas Aghadi and establish BJP-Shiv Sena coalition again.
Subsequently he gathered the support of 2/3rd members of his party.

On 29 June, Uddhav Thackeray resigned from the post of Chief Minister as well as MLC member ahead of the no-confidence motion.
Eknath Shinde took oath as the new Chief Minister with Devendra Fadnavis as Deputy CM on June 30.

Current alliance members 

 note: MPs in the Rajya Sabha And Lok Sabha only include those from Maharashtra seats

Past members

Status in Municipal Corporations

References

Political parties in Maharashtra
Political party alliances in India